Leroy Johnson (December 6, 1919 – December 15, 1944) was a United States Army soldier and a recipient of the United States military's highest decoration, the Medal of Honor, for his actions in World War II. Camp Leroy Johnson in New Orleans, LA, was renamed after him in 1947.

Biography
Johnson joined the Army from Oakdale, Louisiana on November 26, 1941 and was assigned to the 32nd Infantry Division. On April 6, 1943, Sgt. Johnson was awarded the Silver Star for gallantry in action against entrenched Japanese at Senananda. By December 15, 1944, he was serving as a Sergeant in Company K, 126th Infantry Regiment, 32nd Infantry Division during the Battle of Leyte. On that day, near Limon, Leyte, the Philippines, he smothered the blast of two enemy-thrown grenades with his body, sacrificing himself to protect those around him. For this action, he was posthumously awarded the Medal of Honor ten months later, on October 2, 1945.

Johnson was buried at the Manila American Cemetery in Manila, the Philippines. A bronze memorial plaque in his honor was mounted on the wall of the Allen Parish courthouse in Oberlin, Louisiana, a few miles south of his native Oakdale.

Medal of Honor citation
Sergeant Johnson's official Medal of Honor citation reads:

See also

List of Medal of Honor recipients for World War II

References

External links
 

1920 births
1944 deaths
People from Evangeline Parish, Louisiana
Military personnel from Louisiana
United States Army personnel killed in World War II
United States Army Medal of Honor recipients
United States Army soldiers
Recipients of the Silver Star
World War II recipients of the Medal of Honor
Burials at the Manila American Cemetery
People from Allen Parish, Louisiana